Beaumaris can refer to:

 Beaumaris, a town in Wales, UK, and related to it:
Beaumaris Castle
Beaumaris Gaol
Beaumaris (UK Parliament constituency)
 Beaumaris Bay a bay in Victoria, Australia
 Beaumaris, Edmonton, a neighbourhood in Edmonton, Canada.
 Beaumaris, Ontario, a settlement on Lake Muskoka in Ontario, Canada
 Beaumaris, Tasmania, a small town in Tasmania
 Beaumaris, Victoria, a suburb in Melbourne, Victoria, Australia.